Statistics of League of Ireland in the 1966/1967 season.

Overview
It was contested by 12 teams, and Dundalk won the championship.

Final classification

Results

Top scorers

League of Ireland seasons
Ireland
1966–67 in Republic of Ireland association football